Astor Park is an unincorporated community in Lake County, Florida, United States. The community straddles State Road 40, with the community of Astor to the east and the Ocala National Forest to the west. It also includes the northern termini of CR 445 and CR 445A.

Notes

Unincorporated communities in Lake County, Florida
Unincorporated communities in Florida